Rohan Bopanna was the defending champion but chose not to compete this year. 

Robert Smeets won the title, defeating Frederik Nielsen in the final, 7–6(7–5), 6–2.

Seeds

Draw

Finals

Top half

Bottom half

References

External links
 Singles Draw (ATP)
 Official Results Archive (ATP)

Irish Open